

Scottish First Division

Eastern Division

Final League table

Emergency War Cup

See also
List of Hibernian F.C. seasons

References

External links
Hibernian 1939/1940 results and fixtures, Soccerbase

Hibernian F.C. seasons
Hibernian